The Spanish Karting Championship is a kart racing series based in Spain. It has taken place in every year since 2004.

Champions

ICC/KZ2/KZ

X30/Senior

ICA Junior/KF3/KFJ/Junior

Cadet/Mini

Alevin/Academy

References

External links 
 https://www.driverdb.com/championships/karting/

Kart racing series